Schwenningen is the name of several locations in Germany:

Schwenningen, Bavaria
Schwenningen, Sigmaringen
Villingen-Schwenningen